The Conservatoire de Bordeaux is an arts conservatory that offers higher education in music, dance and drama in Bordeaux, France. It is one of the leading schools in France for singers and saxophonists. Founded in 1821, the school is operated by the French Ministry of Culture.

Alumni
 Crown Princess Elia of Albania
 Avguste Antonov
 Frédéric Blanc
 Louis Caimano
 Ferdinand de Craywinckel
 Natalie Dessay
 Mark Engebretson
 Trent Kynaston
 Sarah Lajus
 Christian Lauba
 Jérémie Mazenq
 Marcel Merkès
Florian Sempey

Music schools in France
Music in Bordeaux
Dance schools in France
Drama schools in France